Now's the Time is an album by organist Shirley Scott compiling several tracks recorded between 1958 and 1964 and released on the Prestige label in 1967.

Reception
AllMusic stated: "This is early Scott, several unreleased tunes from different sessions for this Prestige release".

Track listing
All compositions by Shirley Scott, except where noted.
 "As It Was" – 5:20
 "How Sweet" – 7:37
 "Ebb Tide" (Robert Maxwell, Carl Sigman) – 4:05
 "Now's the Time" (Charlie Parker) – 4:35
 "That's Where It's At" – 3:28
 "Cafe Style" – 4:35
 "Out of This World" (Harold Arlen, Johnny Mercer) – 4:37
Recorded at Van Gelder Studio in Hackensack, New Jersey, on May 27, 1958 (track 3) and October 23, 1958 (tracks 5-7) and at Van Gelder Studio in Englewood Cliffs, New Jersey on June 23, 1960 (track 4), August 22, 1961 (track 2), and March 31, 1964 (track 1).

Personnel
 Shirley Scott – organ
 Joe Newman – trumpet (track 2)
 Oliver Nelson (track 2), Stanley Turrentine (track 1) – tenor saxophone
 Lem Winchester – vibraphone (track 4)
 Bob Cranshaw (track 1), George Duvivier (tracks 3-7), George Tucker (track 2) – bass
 Roy Brooks (track 2), Arthur Edgehill (tracks 3-7), Otis Finch (track 1) – drums

References

1967 albums
Albums produced by Esmond Edwards
Albums produced by Bob Weinstock
Albums produced by Ozzie Cadena
Albums recorded at Van Gelder Studio
Prestige Records compilation albums
Shirley Scott albums